The following outline is provided as an overview of and topical guide to China:

The People's Republic of China is the most extensive country in East Asia and the third most extensive country in the world. With a population of over 1,400,000,000, it is the most populous country in the world.

The Chinese Communist Party (CCP) has led the PRC under a one-party system since the state's establishment in 1949. The PRC is involved in a dispute over the political status of Taiwan. The CCP's rival during the Chinese Civil War, the Kuomintang (KMT), fled to Taiwan and surrounding islands after its defeat in 1949, claiming legitimacy over China, Mongolia, and Tuva while it was the ruling power of the Republic of China (ROC). The term "Mainland China" is often used to denote the areas under PRC rule, but sometimes excludes its two Special Administrative Regions: Hong Kong and Macau.

Because of its vast population, rapidly growing economy, and large research and development investments, China is considered an "emerging superpower". It has the world's second largest economy (largest in terms of purchasing power parity.) China is also a permanent member of the United Nations Security Council and Asia-Pacific Economic Cooperation. Since 1978, China's market-based economic reforms have brought the poverty rate down from 53% in 1981 to 8% by 2001. However, China is now faced with a number of other socioeconomic problems, including an aging population, an increasing rural-urban income gap, and rapid environmental degradation.

China plays a major role in international trade. The country is the world's largest consumer of steel and concrete, using, respectively, a third and over a half of the world's supply of each. Counting all products, China is the largest exporter and the second largest importer in the world.

General reference

Pronunciation: 

Common English country name:  China
Official English country name:  The People's Republic of China
Common endonym: 中国 (Zhōngguó) (The Middle Kingdom or Central Realm)
Official endonym: 中华人民共和国 (Zhōnghuá Rénmín Gònghéguó)
Adjectivals:  China, Chinese
Demonym:  Chinese
Etymology: Name of China
International rankings of the People's Republic of China
ISO country codes:  CN, CHN, 156
ISO region codes:  See ISO 3166-2:CN
Internet country code top-level domain:  .cn

Geography of China 

 China is a megadiverse country
Location:
Northern Hemisphere and Eastern Hemisphere
Eurasia
Asia
East Asia
Time zone:  China Standard Time (UTC+08)
Extreme points of China
High: Mount Everest  – highest point on Earth
Low: Turpan Depression 
Land boundaries:  22,117 km
 4,677 km
 3,645 km
 (excluding the territorial border disputes; McMahon Line) 3,380 km
 2,185 km
 1,533 km
 1,416 km
 1,281 km
 1,236 km
 858 km
 523 km
 470 km
 423 km
 414 km
 76 km
Coastline:  14,500 km
Population of China: 1,321,851,888(2007) - 1st most populous country

Area of China:  - 3rd largest country
Atlas of China

Environment of China 

Climate of China
Climate change in China
Environmental issues in China
Pollution in China
Air pollution in China
Water pollution in China
Ecoregions in China
Renewable energy in China
Geology of China
Earthquakes in China
Protected areas of China
Biosphere reserves in China
National parks of China
Wildlife of China
Flora of China
Fauna of China
Birds of China
Mammals of China

Natural geographic features of China 
Glaciers of China
Islands of China
Lakes of China
Mountains of China
Rivers of China
Volcanoes in China
Waterfalls of China

Regions of China

Administrative divisions of China

Provinces of China

Cities of China 

 Direct-administered municipalities of China
 Districts of China
 Counties of China
 Villages of China (list)

Demography of China

Government and politics of China 

Form of government: one-party socialist republic.
Capital of China: Beijing
Elections in China
Political parties in China
Taxation in China

United front
United Front

Ruling party 
Chinese Communist Party
Politburo (Standing Committee)
Secretariat
General Secretary (paramount leader): Xi Jinping

Branches of government

Ultimate authority and Legislative branch
National People's Congress (unicameral)
Standing Committee
Chairman: Li Zhanshu
Head of state (nominal): President, Xi Jinping

Administrative branch
Head of government: Premier, Li Keqiang
State Council, Li's Government

Judicial branch

Supreme People's Court
Chief Justice: Zhou Qiang

Procuratorial branch
Supreme People's Procuratorate

Supervisory branch
National Supervisory Commission (Central Commission for Discipline Inspection)
Secretary: Zhao Leji
Director: Yang Xiaodu

Military branch 
Central Military Commission
Chairman: Xi Jinping

Foreign relations of China 

Diplomatic missions in China
Diplomatic missions of China

International organization membership 
The People's Republic of China is a member of:

African Development Bank Group (AfDB) (nonregional member)
African Union/United Nations Hybrid operation in Darfur (UNAMID)
Arctic Council (observer)
Asian Development Bank (ADB)
Asia-Pacific Economic Cooperation (APEC)
Asia-Pacific Telecommunity (APT)
Association of Southeast Asian Nations (ASEAN) (dialogue partner)
Association of Southeast Asian Nations Regional Forum (ARF)
Bank for International Settlements (BIS)
Caribbean Development Bank (CDB)
Central American Integration System (SICA) (observer)
East Asia Summit (EAS)
Food and Agriculture Organization (FAO)
Group of 24 (G24) (observer)
Group of 77 (G77)
Group of Twenty Finance Ministers and Central Bank Governors (G20)
Inter-American Development Bank (IADB)
International Atomic Energy Agency (IAEA)
International Bank for Reconstruction and Development (IBRD)
International Chamber of Commerce (ICC)
International Civil Aviation Organization (ICAO)
International Criminal Police Organization (Interpol)
International Development Association (IDA)
International Federation of Red Cross and Red Crescent Societies (IFRCS)
International Finance Corporation (IFC)
International Fund for Agricultural Development (IFAD)
International Hydrographic Organization (IHO)
International Labour Organization (ILO)
International Maritime Organization (IMO)
International Mobile Satellite Organization (IMSO)
International Monetary Fund (IMF)
International Olympic Committee (IOC)
International Organization for Migration (IOM)
International Organization for Standardization (ISO)
International Red Cross and Red Crescent Movement (ICRM)
International Telecommunication Union (ITU)
International Telecommunications Satellite Organization (ITSO)

International Vaccine Institute (IVI)
Inter-Parliamentary Union (IPU)
Latin American Integration Association (LAIA) (observer)
Multilateral Investment Guarantee Agency (MIGA)
Nonaligned Movement (NAM) (observer)
Nuclear Suppliers Group (NSG)
Organisation for the Prohibition of Chemical Weapons (OPCW)
Organization of American States (OAS) (observer)
Pacific Islands Forum (PIF) (partner)
Permanent Court of Arbitration (PCA)
Shanghai Cooperation Organisation (SCO)
South Asian Association for Regional Cooperation (SAARC) (observer)
United Nations (UN)
United Nations Conference on Trade and Development (UNCTAD)
United Nations Educational, Scientific, and Cultural Organization (UNESCO)
United Nations High Commissioner for Refugees (UNHCR)
United Nations Industrial Development Organization (UNIDO)
United Nations Institute for Training and Research (UNITAR)
United Nations Integrated Mission in Timor-Leste (UNMIT)
United Nations Interim Force in Lebanon (UNIFIL)
United Nations Mission for the Referendum in Western Sahara (MINURSO)
United Nations Mission in Liberia (UNMIL)
United Nations Mission in the Sudan (UNMIS)
United Nations Operation in Cote d'Ivoire (UNOCI)
United Nations Organization Mission in the Democratic Republic of the Congo (MONUC)
United Nations Security Council (permanent member, since 1971)
United Nations Truce Supervision Organization (UNTSO)
Universal Postal Union (UPU)
World Customs Organization (WCO)
World Federation of Trade Unions (WFTU)
World Health Organization (WHO)
World Intellectual Property Organization (WIPO)
World Meteorological Organization (WMO)
World Tourism Organization (UNWTO)
World Trade Organization (WTO)
Zangger Committee (ZC)

Law and order in China 

Capital punishment in China
Constitution of the People's Republic of China
Crime in China
Human rights in China
Freedom of religion in China
Percecution of Christians in China
Law enforcement in the People's Republic of China

Military of China 

Command
Commander-in-chief: Chairman of the Central Military Commission
Central Military Commission
People's Liberation Army
Ground Force
Ranks of the People's Liberation Army Ground Force
Navy
Ranks of the People's Liberation Army Navy
Air Force
Ranks of the People's Liberation Army Air Force
Rocket Force
Strategic Support Force
People's Armed Police
Militia
Military history of China (pre-1911)

Local government in China 
Local government in China

History of China 

Economic history of China
Military history of China (pre-1911)
List of earthquakes in China

Culture of China 

Architecture of China
 Art in China
Cinema of China
Chinese clothing
Cuisine of China
Ethnic minorities in China
Festivals in China
Languages of China
Media in China
National symbols of China
National Emblem of the People's Republic of China
Flag of the People's Republic of China
National anthem of China
People of China
Prostitution in China
Public holidays in the People's Republic of China
Religion in China
Buddhism in China
 Chinese folk religion
Christianity in China
Hinduism in China
Islam in China
Judaism in China
List of World Heritage Sites in China
Literature of China
Music of China
Television in the People's Republic of China
Theatre in China

Sports in China 

Football in China
China at the Olympics
China at the Asian Games

Economy and infrastructure of China 

Economic rank, by nominal GDP (2011): 2nd (second)
Agriculture in China
Banking in China
People's Bank of China
Communications in China
Internet in China
Asia-Pacific Network Information Centre
Currency of China: Renminbi Yuan
ISO 4217: CNY
Economic history of China
Energy in China
Energy policy of China
Oil industry in China
Health care in China
Chinese stock exchanges
Tourism in China
Transport in China
Airports in China
Rail transport in China
Roads in China
Water supply and sanitation in China

Education in China 

Higher education in China
List of universities in China

See also 

International rankings of China
List of China-related topics
Member state of the Group of Twenty Finance Ministers and Central Bank Governors
Member state of the United Nations
Outline of Asia
Outline of geography
Outline of Hong Kong
Outline of Macau
Outline of Taiwan
Outline of Tibet

Notes

References

External links

China.org.cn China news, weather, business, travel, language courses, archives
U.S. Department of State, Background Note on China
Interactive China map with province and city guides.
China Digital Times Online China news portal, run by the Graduate School of Journalism of University of California at Berkeley.
China Worker
China Map
China Flights
NY Inquirer: China's 21st Century
The Chinese Superpower-Historical Background, Dr Rivka Shpak-Lissak
 China Map Quest
The 200 best books on China

China